Pastures FC (known as BESCO Pastures FC for sponsorship reasons and previously known as Pastures United FC) is a football club based in Layou, Saint Vincent and the Grenadines.

Having won the SVGFF First Division In 2009, they have been promoted and will play in the NLA Premier League and which the club won the NLA Premier championship in 2013 – 2014 . The club hails from Buccament Bay, in the St. Patrick Parish With 4 of the National Players on the team.

History

Squad

External links
St. Vincent and the Grenadines Football Federation

References

Football clubs in Saint Vincent and the Grenadines
1972 establishments in Saint Vincent and the Grenadines